King of Culinary (Raja Kaiya Vecha; lit. Three Knives) is a Singaporean Chinese culinary game show broadcast on Mediacorp Channel 5, Channel 8, Suria, Vasantham and simulcast on MeWATCH and YouTube. Season 1 was aired only on Channel 8 and hosted by television personality Lee Teng, with home cooks pitting against veteran top chefs for a cash prize and a set of kitchen knives. The first season premiered for 13 episodes which premiered 3 July 2019 and ended on 25 September 2019. The show announced for a second season in 2020, with the second season slated for a 18 November 2020 premiere date; the second season is hosted by Cavin Soh, who previously served as a judge in season 1 and aired on Channel 8. A third season was announced on 15 February 2022 and will be premiering in three languages for Chinese, Malay and Tamil beginning 20 August 2022.

Gameplay
Each contestant will pit against one of three veteran chefs (from left to right, Eric Teo, Pung Lu Tin and Eric Neo) head-to-head, whom each hold one signature culinary knife placed under a shelf, and sitting chefs are backed as judges. At the start of each match, the contestant choose one of the chef and a designated ingredient required for cooking, but was not allowed to duplicate a cooking method. The contestant have up to an hour, with the first 15 minutes set as a handicap for the veteran chef, to prepare a dish and present it to a panel of three judges for testing and evaluation. The judges then make a decision to decide which dish is better and the victor in each match.

When the contestant wins a match, they win cash and a knife, and was given an option to either keep it or risk them to challenge another chef but each contestant can only challenge a chef once. Beating one chef awards the contestant $1,000, two chefs are worth $2,000, and beating all three chefs awards the contestant $5,000. However, if the contestant loses to a chef at any point, the game ends and any cash winnings won are forfeited, but was allowed to keep any knives won for victorious matches up to that point.

At the end of season 1, 10 out of 26 chefs had won at least one set of knife for winning a match (Teo won 8 out of 12 matches, Pung won 7 out of 11 matches, and Neo won 8 out of 11 matches); one of the winning contestant, Royce Lee (with two episodes airing 18 and 25 September) won two knives and $2,000 though not deciding to risk the prize money to contest Neo for the third knife.

In season 2, contestants have to defeat a mentee chef first before they could challenge against the three chefs, meaning that the contestant was now required to win four matches (one disciple and three chefs) to acquire all three knives. Each challenge now have a 40 minute time limit with a 10-minute handicap, and the payout structure for each knife were respectively changed to $2,000, $3,000 and $4,000. Prior to a match against a chef, the contestants picked one of four "help cards" to change the course of a match.

Season 3 retains the competition format rules from the previous season, though that now the best performing winning chef (based on the number of victories and progress) after the respective seasons ended will advance to the finale where the three top cooks pit in the season finale to determine the overall champion and a prize of up to $16,000.

References

Singaporean game shows
2010s Singaporean television series
2019 Singaporean television series debuts
Channel 8 (Singapore) original programming